Michael Seddon (born 13 May 1958) is a former Australian rules footballer who played for the Melbourne Football Club in the Victorian Football League (VFL) during the early 1980s.

Recruited from Tasmanian Football League club Sandy Bay, Seddon was Melbourne's ruck-rover for four seasons before returning to Tasmania. He shared the William Leitch Medal in 1988 with Glenorchy's Adrian Fletcher.

References

Demon Wiki profile
Holmesby, Russell and Main, Jim (2007). The Encyclopedia of AFL Footballers. 7th ed. Melbourne: Bas Publishing.

1958 births
Living people
Melbourne Football Club players
Sandy Bay Football Club players
William Leitch Medal winners
Australian rules footballers from Tasmania
Tasmanian Football Hall of Fame inductees